Sweet cicely is a common name for several plants and may refer to:

 Cicely, a cultivated European herb (Myrrhis odorata)
 Osmorhiza, a genus of plants native to North America